Peter Kwong Kong-kit  (born 28 February 1936) was the first Primate of the Hong Kong Sheng Kung Hui (i.e. the Anglican Church), Archbishop of Hong Kong and Bishop of the Diocese of Hong Kong Island following the establishment of the Anglican Communion's Province of Hong Kong after the Handover. He was the first Chinese bishop of the diocese of Hong Kong and Macao.

Kwong was the chaplain of Chung Chi College and lectured at the Chinese University of Hong Kong until he was appointed diocesan secretary in 1979. In 1981 he became the Bishop of Hong Kong and Macao; he was consecrated a bishop on 25 March 1981 at St John's Cathedral (Hong Kong); his diocese was split in order to create the new church Province of Hong Kong, and the portion he retained became the Diocese of Hong Kong Island (and he the Bishop of Hong Kong Island). Kwong was installed at the same Cathedral as the first Chinese archbishop of the Anglican Church on 25 October 1998.

His contributions to the community of Hong Kong are wide and varied. He participated in the discussions leading up to the reunification of Hong Kong with the Mainland through the Consultative Committee for the Basic Law, the Preparatory Committee for the SAR and the Selection Committee. He was Advisor on Hong Kong Affairs between 1992 and 1997. After the Handover he became a member of the Chinese People's Political Consultative Conference.

Following his retirement in January 2007, he has become the Archbishop Emeritus of Hong Kong Sheng Kung Hui and the Bishop Emeritus of the Diocese of Hong Kong Island.

He is advisor to the Amity Foundation of China, vice-president of the Church Missionary Society and patron of the Comfort Care Concern Group, an organisation for the terminally ill. He has been awarded the degree Doctor of Divinity honoris causa by Kenyon College, Bexley Hall and, in 2000, the University of Hong Kong.

In 2007 Kwong was succeeded by the new Archbishop and Primate, Paul Kwong (no relation).

See also

 Archbishop of Hong Kong
 Primates in the Anglican Communion
 List of Bishops and Archbishops

References

External links
Anglican website article on Kwong
Hong Kong University honorary doctorate information

20th-century Anglican archbishops
21st-century Anglican archbishops
Alumni of St. Paul's College, Hong Kong
Anglican archbishops of Hong Kong
Chinese Christians
Christianity in Macau
Living people
20th-century Anglican bishops in China
Date of birth missing (living people)
Place of birth missing (living people)
1936 births
Members of the Preparatory Committee for the Hong Kong Special Administrative Region
Hong Kong Basic Law Consultative Committee members
Hong Kong Basic Law Drafting Committee members
Hong Kong Affairs Advisors
Members of the Selection Committee of Hong Kong
Hong Kong Sheng Kung Hui
21st-century Anglican bishops in China
Anglican bishops of Hong Kong Island
Anglican bishops of Hong Kong and Macao